Ashfield Football Club are a Scottish football club based in the Possilpark area of north Glasgow.

Formed in 1886, they are based at Saracen Park, which they share with the Glasgow Tigers speedway team; it is located a short distance from Keppoch Park, home of neighbours Glasgow Perthshire. In October 2004, the club lost many historical records and strips as a result of a fire at Saracen Park.

In July 2018 former Ashfield player Paul Maxwell took over as manager with former player Ryan Cairley taking over as assistant.

Honours

Scottish Junior Cup
Winners: 1893–94, 1894–95, 1904–05, 1909–10
Runners-up: 1913–14, 1920–21
Central Junior Football League
Winners: 1952–53, 1954–55
Glasgow Junior Football League
Winners: 1905–06, 1906–07, 1907–08, 1908–09, 1909–10, 1920–21
 Scottish Intermediate Football League
Winners: 1928–29
West Super League First Division
Winners: 2010–11
 Central League C Division
Winners: 1968–69
West Region Central Second Division 
Winners: 2006–07
 Central Region Division Two
Winners: 1990–91

Other Honours
 Evening Times Cup winners 2011-12
 West of Scotland Junior Cup winners: 1927–28, 1928–29
 Glasgow Junior Cup winners: 1893–94, 1905–06, 1906–07, 1907–08, 1908–09, 1909–10, 1914–15, 1925–26, 1951–52, 1952–53, 1962–63
 Glasgow Dryburgh Cup: 1926–27, 1928–29, 1946–47, 1952–53, 1962–63
 Maryhill Charity Cup: 1898, 1918

Former players
 
1. Players that have played/managed in the Football League or any foreign equivalent to this level (i.e. fully professional league).
 Johnny Quigley - Nottingham Forest, Huddersfield Town, Bristol City, Mansfield Town
 Walter Smith - Dundee Utd, Glasgow Rangers, Everton, Scotland
 Bobby Parker
 Bill Finlayson

2. Players with full international caps.
 Archie Gray
 Tommy Ring
 Alex Massie 
 Alex James
 Bobby Neill 
 Jimmy Gibson
 Johnny Crum 
 Jimmy Blair 
 Stevie Chalmers

3. Players that hold a club record or have captained the club.

References

External links
 
 Facebook
 Twitter

 
Football clubs in Scotland
Scottish Junior Football Association clubs
Football clubs in Glasgow
Association football clubs established in 1886
1886 establishments in Scotland
West of Scotland Football League teams